Eroni's Circus is a traditional travelling Australian circus, founded in 2007 and owned by Tony and Cathy Maynard.
Acts include performing horses and ponies, trick roping, performing dogs, hula hoops, trapeze, and other aerial acts, acrobats, juggling, clowns, etc. Eroni's Circus performs in a 32-metre, red-and-white Big Top marquee. 
 
The circus often performs at agricultural shows and corporate functions

Former Eroni Brothers Circus: 1st incarnation
The current incarnation of Eroni's is not to be confused with another circus that was operated by distant relatives of the current proprietary's and operated from 1889 until the early 20th century, and also went by the name of Eroni Brothers Circus.

The first Eroni's Circus toured Australia from the late-1800s until the 1920s, run by Tony Maynard's great-great-grandfather William Perry, himself having split off from a larger circus called the Perry Bros, the first circus to circumnavigate Australia.

See also
List of circuses and circus owners

References

External links
Business listing
Article
Facebook-WEBSITE
Companies

Australian circuses
Entertainment companies established in 2007
Performing groups established in 2007
2007 establishments in Australia
Horse circuses and entertainment